Han Jong-in (born August 9, 1978) is a North Korean figure skater. He represented unified Korea at the 2006 Winter Olympics, where he had the honor of bearing the special Unification Flag alongside South Korean speed skater, Lee Bo-ra.

At the Olympics, he placed last in the short program and did not advance to the free skating.

Results

External links
 

1978 births
Living people
North Korean male single skaters
Olympic figure skaters of North Korea
Figure skaters at the 2006 Winter Olympics
Sportspeople from Pyongyang